Herochroma ochreipicta is a species of moth of the family Geometridae first described by Charles Swinhoe in 1905. It is found in China (Fujian, Guangxi, Yunnan), Taiwan, north-eastern India, Nepal and northern Vietnam.

References

External links
"A study on the genus Herochroma Swinhoe in China, with descriptions of four new species (Lepidoptera: Geometridae: Geometrinae)". Acta Entomologica Sinica

Moths described in 1905
Pseudoterpnini
Moths of Asia